Babamania is a Japanese rock group best known for their 2003 hit "Wanna Rock," which is known internationally due to its inclusion on the multi-platform video game FIFA Football 2004. They are also known for their track "Doobee Doowop Communication" which was played at the end of the anime Rockman EXE Stream.

Although they formed in 1992, Babamania didn't release any material until 1999 when female vocalist Mari joined. They have since released eight albums and a 'best of' compilation called Bababest.

Line-up
 Vocal: DJ Mari
 Vocals (rap, MC): Genki
 Guitar: Yujin

Former members:
 Bass: Takeo (left in 2002)
 Drums: Daigo (left in 2006)

Discography

Albums
 Babamania (EP) (2000)
 Pau Hana (EP) (200)
 Diskord (2000)
 Just Come Up (2001)
 Pornmuzik (2001)
 I.D. (2002)
 Ilnana (2003)
 Jungle Livin''' (2003)
 Great Grand Bag Of Magic Tricks (2005)
 Bababest (2005)
 Zero Gravity Disco'' (2006)

Singles
 "A Man of Tearz" (2000)
 "Take It" (2001)
 "Wanna Rock" (2003)
 "Doobee Doowop Communication" (2003)
 "Nobody's Girl" (2004)
 "Sunrise" (2005)

External links
Official Website
Official label Website

Japanese rock music groups